Giannis Manolioudis (born 23 May 2003) is a Greek professional footballer who plays as a centre-back for Super League 2 club Veria.

References

2003 births
Living people
Greek footballers
Super League Greece 2 players
PAOK FC players
Association football defenders
Footballers from Rethymno
PAOK FC B players